is a Japanese politician and member of House of Representatives for the Japanese Communist Party.

References

1959 births
Living people
Politicians from Akita Prefecture
Female members of the House of Representatives (Japan)
Members of the House of Representatives (Japan)
Japanese Communist Party politicians
21st-century Japanese politicians
21st-century Japanese women politicians